Portuguese Well is a water well in Kampung Pengkalan Samak, Merlimau, Jasin District, Malacca, Malaysia, which was built with laterite rocks obtained from the beaches. The well was dug by the Portuguese during their rule in Malacca as the water source for the soldiers when they were stationed here to protect Merlimau from the attack which came from Muar.

See also
 List of tourist attractions in Malacca

References

Jasin District
Water wells in Melaka